Suntrip Records is a half-French, half-Belgian record label, releasing Goa trance and melodic Psychedelic trance.
Suntrip Records was set up in the summer of 2004 by Fabien "Mars" Marsaud, one of the founders of the Psynews.org website and Joske "Anoebis"  Vranken, a Belgian DJ and party-organiser.

In 2002, the first ideas for founding a melodic Goa trance label arose. It would offer an alternative to modern Full on psychedelic trance, a music style that branched off Goa trance. The idea was to release new Goa trance music similar to its style in 1995–1998, but with modern production.

The first album to be released on Suntrip Records was Sky Input by Swedish composer Filteria. The Suntrip Association was officially created under French law on 17 July 2004, its office situated in Malakoff, France, and its board comprised four people.

On 16 October 2007, Suntrip became a Belgian company as a Vennootschap onder firma. Its office used to be situated in Ghent and moved to Maarkedal in 2018.

In 2017, Chris Roquet, joined this core team to take care of the bookings' activity, 604 bookings.

Suntrip releases mainly melodic Goa trance, but occasionally also offers music close to the Dark genres with the "Ka-Sol - Fairytale" and "Temple of Chaos" albums, as well as Ambient such as the compilation "Opus Iridium" and the album "Electrypnose - Sweet Sadness".

See also
 List of record labels

External links
 Official site

 Suntrip Records CDs at psyshop with preview tracks

French record labels
Belgian record labels
Record labels established in 2004
Psychedelic trance record labels